Facundo Tomás Quignón (born 2 May 1993) is an Argentine professional footballer who plays as a midfielder for Major League Soccer club FC Dallas.

Club career
In June 2021, Quignón signed with FC Dallas on a two-and-a-half-year contract.

On April 23, 2022, Quignón scored his first MLS goal, against Houston Dynamo FC in a 2–1 FC Dallas win.

On October 17, 2022, he scored his first MLS playoff goal in a 2-1 FC Dallas victory against Minnesota United to help send them to the conference semifinals.

International career
In October 2009, Quignón represented the Argentina national under-17 team at the 2009 FIFA U-17 World Cup.

Honours
San Lorenzo
 Copa Libertadores: 2014
 Supercopa Argentina: 2015

References

External links
 Facundo Quignon at Football-Lineups
 
 Facundo Quignon – Argentine Primera statistics at Fútbol XXI 

1993 births
Living people
Argentina youth international footballers
Argentine expatriate footballers
Argentine expatriate sportspeople in the United States
Argentine footballers
Argentine Primera División players
Association football midfielders
Club Atlético Lanús footballers
Expatriate soccer players in the United States
FC Dallas players
Major League Soccer players
Newell's Old Boys footballers
San Lorenzo de Almagro footballers
Footballers from Buenos Aires